Private Jets is a Swedish power pop quartet, founded in 2001 by the twins Erik and Per Westin.

The band started out as a song writing project, the brothers curious to see if they could mix their influences of pop, rock and jazz into their own brand of power pop with ambiguous lyrics and smart arrangements. When pushed by pop enthusiasts to record some of the songs, they realized that they had to put a band together. Janne Hellman was recruited as lead vocalist together with Mikael Olsson on bass, Olsson who had previous worked with the brothers in the hi-speed pop outfit Revolver Bop Agents.

First release
Private Jets released the debut EP “A Four Leaf Clover in E-Major” on May 27, 2002 on Sparkplug Records. It contained four songs and a short snippet and was well received by the power pop community. The songs were written, arranged, produced and to a large extent performed by the brothers. Lead vocals was provided by Janne Hellman on all tracks and Olsson played bass on the song Millionseller.

In a radio interview on Swedish Radio, Erik Westin explained that the band were basically writing what they wanted to hear but couldn’t really seem to find anywhere. He also said that the ambition with the band is to write the ultimate pop song over and over again.

Second release
After the release of “A Four Leaf Clover in E-Major” the brothers started to work on a new album. The band bio states that they wrote 43 new songs to be able to make an album filled with singles only. It says that they would strive for nothing less than power pop perfection. Of the songs written, the band chose to record twelve, and the result can be heard on the album “Jet Sounds”, released on May 26, 2008.

Live gigs
In May 2008 Private Jets made their live debut at the Cavern Club in Liverpool, playing the International Pop Overthrow. An extra show was added.

On Saturday November 7, 2008, the band played at the International Pop Overthrow in New York City, performing at Kenny’s Castaways in Greenwich Village.

Members 
 Erik Westin - guitar, vocals
 Per Westin - guitar, vocals, drums, keyboards
 Janne Hellman - lead vocals
 Micke Olsson - bass

Additional help 
 Magnus Adell played bass on two tracks on “Jet Sounds” – “Fast forward with you” and “Speak up, speak out”.
 Thomas Hedquist, sound engineer at Quest Studios, did the final mixing on both “Jet Sounds” and “A Four Leaf Clover in E-Major”.

Voices about Jet Sounds 
”Unlike most of their brethren, Private Jets go beyond mere stylistic worship to forge their own sound. The cleverly titled Jet Sounds is a gorgeous slab of retro-pop but what really seals the deal is the four-song EP, A FOUR LEAF CLOVER IN E MAJOR. Too many highlights on the album, but “Extraordinary Sensations,” “Speak Up, Speak Out,” and “Fireman for a Day” and its follow-up “Fire Academy” all have that Brill Building ethic.” 
Mike Baron's Top Ten Records of 2008! Monday, December 15, 2008 

”All the way from Sweden come Private Jets, whose Jet Sounds (wink, nudge) on Sparkplug Records is a spectacular distillation of bands such as Jellyfish, The Cars and The Beach Boys. A dozen glorious, sing-along tunes laced with perky synthesizers, shiny harmonies and punchy guitars all add up to another release that deserves to be heard by many. Random thoughts on this one: Ringo Starr should cover “Starshaped World;” “Speak Up, Speak Out” recalls “Ain’t That a Shame;” the dorky lyrics to “First Division of Love” add to the song’s charm; and “I Wanna Be a Private Jet” is the finest musical self-reference since Prince’s “My Name is Prince.”
John M. Borack, Goldmine, November 14, 2008 

”Swedish power pop has a great rep. Bands like Private Jets merely confirms why. Believe me, listening to this talented quartet, will leave you with a sugar rush. Throwing in every pop cliche in the book, from show tunes to Jellyfish riffs, enveloped with high-octane harmonies, toe-tapping rhythms, sensual chord changes and sweet sweet tunes, Private Jets don’t give pop junkies much of a chance of losing the habit. And the Beach Boys references are not limited to the album title - I mean, The Fire Academy contains jazz vocal arrangements that Brian Wilson himself would be impressed with. 
Elsewhere, you will catch the McCartney inflections (Jet!) on tracks like I Wanna Be A Private Jet, Speak Up, Speak Out and Starshaped World. If you’ve got the McCartney/Wilson camp on your side, chances are that the pop underground will adopt you as its own. Beyond that, I don’t know but anyone with a sweet tooth will find it hard to resist Jet Sounds.”
Powerofpop.com, September 12, 2008

Voices about the debut EP
“Target in My Heart” and “Magic” are over-the-top, Jellyfish ambitious, suite-like compositions with gorgeous harmonies. “Magic” is a bodacious sunrise of a song with a soaring chorus and the line “My heart is beating like Keith Moon,” followed by the most exquisite a cappella since Take 6.”
Mike Baron's Top Ten Records of 2008! Monday, December 15, 2008
“Brilliant debut EP from one of Sweden’s purest popsters! Four slices of pop bliss!”
Ray Gianchett, Kool Kat Musik Newsletter, June 2002

“This 4-track EP boasts mellifluous strength, sumptuous chord changes, classy studio work and divine harmonies – power pop splendour to the nth degree!” - Kevin Mathews, Power of Pop.com

“Really good stuff!”
David Bash, International Pop Overthrow, at Audities Discussion List, April 2002 

“Pop fireworks all over, exploding, sharp riffs, totally and forcibly memorable melodies! File under Magical power pop sensation!”
Not Lame Records, Newsletter June 2002

“Private Jets has a simplistic approach that can’t fail to hit the spot with anyone who has a liking for uncomplicated guitarpop ditties.”
Scootering Magazine, Issue 193, June 2002

Influences
The band's MySpace site lists Sweet, Jellyfish, The Zombies, Beach Boys, The Move, The Records, and The Rubinoos as influences.

References

External links
 The official band site
 The band's myspace page

Power pop groups
Swedish pop music groups